Asian Music Private Limited   (AMC), is a Nepalese music company.  

AMC was founded in 2004 and focuses on promoting new talent, having produced over 2,000 albums.

History
AMC was founded by Ishwar Gurung and entered into production in 2004 with the album Kathmandu. This was AMC's first original music soundtrack release, with music scored by Nabin K Bhattarai.
AMC has worked with various singers and music directors, including Nabin K Bhattarai, Deep Shrestha, Himal Sagar, Nipesh DHAKA, Bijay Lama, Kamal K Chettri and Sandesh Subedi, and later ventured into manufacturing consumer electronics goods and audio-video systems, also under the AMC brand until 2007.

Production Music (Albums)

Awards

References

External links
 asianmusic.com.np/ Asian Music Pvt.
 Director of Asian music : Ishwor Gurung
 
 

Record label distributors
Record labels established in 2004
Portable audio player manufacturers
Music companies of Nepal
2004 establishments in Nepal